Le Voyage is the fourth album by Paul Motian to be released on the ECM label. It was released in 1979 and features performances by Motian with bassist Jean-François Jenny-Clark and saxophonist Charles Brackeen.

Reception
The Allmusic review by Don Snowden awarded the album 4 stars, stating, "Le Voyage is a very reflective, ruminative disc bordering on chamber jazz and marked by that distinctive ECM sound, clean but very distant. It's top-quality music, but look to Dance for more liveliness and ebullience in this phase of Paul Motian's career.".

Track listing
 "Folk Song for Rosie" - 9:53  
 "Abacus" - 7:16  
 "Cabala/Drum Music" - 6:09  
 "Sunflower" - 8:48  
 "Le Voyage" - 11:12

All compositions by Paul Motian

Personnel
Paul Motian - drums, percussion
Jean-François Jenny-Clark - bass
Charles Brackeen - soprano and tenor saxophones

References 

1979 albums
Paul Motian albums
ECM Records albums
Albums produced by Manfred Eicher